The 2018–19 Liga II (also known as 2018–19 Liga II Casa Pariurilor) was the 79th season of the Liga II, the second tier of the Romanian football league system. The season began on 4 August 2018 and ended on 1 June 2019.

A total of 20 teams contested the league. It was the third Liga II season with a single series. The season was played in a round-robin tournament. The first two teams were promoted to Liga I at the end of the season and the third-placed team played a play-off match against the 12th-placed team from Liga I. The last five teams were relegated to Liga III.

Team changes

To Liga II
Promoted from Liga III
 Aerostar Bacău  (after 26 years of absence)
 Farul Constanța  (after 2 years of absence)
 Petrolul Ploiești  (after 7 years of absence)
 Șirineasa  (debut)
 Universitatea Cluj  (after 2 years of absence)

Relegated from Liga I
 ACS Poli Timișoara  (after 3 years of absence)
 Juventus București  (after 1 year of absence)

From Liga II
Relegated to Liga III
 Afumați  (ended 2-year stay)
 Știința Miroslava  (ended 1-year stay)
 Foresta Suceava  (ended 6-year stay)
 Târgu Mureș  (ended 1-year stay)
 Olimpia Satu Mare  (ended 5-year stay)

Promoted to Liga I
 Dunărea Călărași  (ended 2-year stay)
 Hermannstadt  (ended 1-year stay)

Excluded teams
Afumați withdrew from Liga II after the end of the last season and was enrolled instead in the Liga III, a move made due to financial reasons.

Teams spared from relegation
Metaloglobus București was spared from relegation due to withdrawal of Afumați.

Renamed teams
Juventus București was renamed as Daco-Getica București after being summoned by Juventus Torino to remove the term "Juventus" from its name.

Șirineasa was renamed as Energeticianul.

Stadiums by capacity

Stadiums by locations

Personnel and kits 

Note: Flags indicate national team as has been defined under FIFA eligibility rules. Players and Managers may hold more than one non-FIFA nationality.

Managerial changes

League table

Season results

Liga I play-off
The 12th-placed team of the Liga I faces the 3rd-placed team of the Liga II.

|}

Season statistics

Top scorers
Updated to matches played on 1 June 2019.

Clean sheets
Updated to matches played on 1 June 2019.

*Only goalkeepers who played all 90 minutes of a match are taken into consideration.

Attendances

References

2018-19
Rom
2018–19 in Romanian football